WE School is a private business school in India, with branches in Mumbai and Bangalore. Mumbai is the older center.

History
Prin. L. N. Welingkar Institute of Management Development & Research (WeSchool) is a Business School in India. Run by Shikshan Prasarak Mandali, Pune, a charitable trust in Maharashtra. Established in 1977 it offers Post Graduate Diplomas in Management in Retail, Family Managed Business, Business Design & Innovation, Rural Management, Healthcare Management, Media & Entertainment Management and E-business.

WeSchool, Bangalore was established in 2008 at Electronic City Phase -1 and has 3 full-time courses: PGDM, PGDM–E Biz and PGDM-Business Design & Innovation.

WeSchool has programs such as Post graduation in Business management, Business Design and Innovation, E-business, Retail, Healthcare, Rural Management, programs for Family Managed business, initiated several partnerships with industry and international universities. In 2015, WeSchool received the 'AICTE -CII best
industry-linked management institute' award.

Key milestones
1977: MANDALI sets up Prin L N Welingkar Institute of Management Development & Research
1984-1986: First batch of MMS, affiliation with the University of Mumbai
1994:  PGDM, AICTE approved MMS & MMM (Part-Time)
2001: PGDM Ebiz
2002: College shifted to a new campus in Matunga, Mumbai
2002: MIM /MIF (part-time)
2004: Bengaluru Campus established with Ebiz
2005: PGDM Retail introduced
2007: Introduced the PGDM –Business Design program
2010: PGDM Executive course introduced
2011: PGDM Healthcare introduced
2011: PGDM Rural Management (Emerging Economies) launched
2014: PGP Entrepreneurship introduced
2016: PGDM Media and Entertainment introduced

Global linkages
WeSchool has established international links with foreign universities like Copenhagen Business School (Denmark), Malardalen University and Jonkoping International Business School (Sweden), Lancaster University and  University of Hull (UK), MacEwan University (Canada), Otto Friedrich Universidad and Stuggart Media University (Germany), Unitec Institute (New Zealand) and Curtin Technical University (Australia).

Courses offered
 Masters in Management Studies (MMS)
 Post Graduate Diploma in Management(PGDM)
 Post Graduate Diploma in Management (E-Business)
 Post Graduate Diploma in Management in Business Design(PGDM-BD)
 Post Graduate Diploma in Management in Healthcare
 PGDM-Rural Management (Emerging Economies)
 PGDM Retail Management
 PGDM Research and Business Analytics
 PGDM Media & Entertainment
 Post Graduate Program in Entrepreneurship
 Post Graduate Program in Media & Entertainment Management

Campuses

WeSchool Mumbai
WeSchool expanded from the small space of 10,000 sq ft in Sion, Mumbai to the newer campus with total area of 1, 70,000 square feet in Matunga, Mumbai. Currently, Prof. Dr. Uday Salunkhe is the Group Director of both Mumbai and Bangalore campuses. WeSchool offers hostel facilities for boys and girls within 2 km from the college. Availability of hostel rooms are on a first come first serve basis and first preference is given to non locals.

WeSchool-Bangalore 
The Bengaluru campus of Welingkar was inaugurated in 2008., on a 1.5-acre property in Electronic City, Bangalore, in the vicinity of over 180 IT companies. Being a residential school, there are over 300 students studying at WeSchool, all from different parts of the country.

The Bangalore Campus is known for its various events conducted by Career Management Center (CMC) involving several sector-based Industry Roundtables to engage senior members from the corporate and invite them for sectorial discussions at Welingkar, where the students can also present their learnings and projects.

There are annual sports events Jogabonito and We-cricket where alumni, faculty, and students participate. The college has a cafeteria called Unwind and a ‘Hobby Kitchen’ where students can prepare food for themselves and sports facilities like gym, table tennis, a billiards room and Badminton Courts.

There are various clubs in the college- MPower- The Marketing Club, Arthakul- The Finance Club, Ethnos- HR Club, Operations Club which organize various events, roundtables, conferences every year enabling to students to build industrial connections and interact with the experts in the field.

Welingkar’s Distance Learning Program(DLP)/ Part Time (3 Years )
The autonomous Welingkar Institute of Management offers distance learning programs. It is one of the few institutions whose distance learning programs have been accredited by Distance Education Council (DEC), a body of the Central Govt. of India.

Distance Education Council (DEC) has been set up by the Govt. of India under the IGNOU Act for assessment and accreditation of distance education institutes in India.

Welingkar's Distance Learning Program (DLP) was appraised by DEC with regard to its content, quality of education and its delivery systems.

Specializations available:
 Marketing Management
 Finance
 Human Resource Management
 Operations Management
 Rural Management
 Retail Management
 General Management
 Operations Management
 E-Business
 General Management
 Services Excellence
 Rural and Agri. Business
 Media And Advertising
 Travel & Tourism mgmt.
 Healthcare management
 Hospitality Management
 IT Project Management
 Banking, Insurance & Investment
 Advertising & Media

References

Walingkar's online We School

WE School
Educational institutions established in 1977
1977 establishments in Karnataka